Mychal Lemar Ammons (born January 2, 1992) is an American professional basketball player who last played for the Tijuana Zonkeys of the Circuito de Baloncesto de la Costa del Pacífico (CIBACOPA). He played college basketball for South Alabama.

High school career
Ammons attended Vicksburgh High School where he averaged 21.8 points, 8.9 rebounds and 2.1 blocks as a senior and led the Gators to the 6A state championship game. This earned him the MVP award of the Mississippi State tournament and was named First Team All-State by MagnoliaPreps.com.

College career
After graduating, Ammons attended South Alabama where he, as a junior, was third in scoring (9.3 points) and second in rebounds (7.2) while playing an average of 27.9 minutes a game, shooting 43.9 percent from the floor, 37.1 percent from 3-point range and 64.4 percent at the free throw line. On April 16, 2014, he decided to forgo his senior season to play overseas.

Professional career
After applying for early entry to the 2014 NBA draft, Ammons signed a contract with Feni Industries of Macedonia on May 12, 2014. After averaging 9.4 points, 7.2 rebounds, 1.8 assists and 1.3 blocks per game, Ammons parted ways with Feni Industries on July 1, 2015.

On November 1, 2015, Ammons was acquired by the Idaho Stampede of the NBA Development League following a successful tryout with the team. However, he was waived on November 11 before the start of the season. On November 26, he was acquired by Estudiantes Concordia of Argentina. On January 23, 2016, he returned to Idaho, making his debut that night in a 108–101 loss to the Texas Legends, recording two points and four rebounds in seven minutes.

On May 20, 2016, Ammons signed with the Tijuana Zonkeys of the Mexican Circuito de Baloncesto de la Costa del Pacífico. That day, he made his debut for the Zonkeys in a 92–87 loss to the Garra Cañera de Navolato, recording nine points, four rebounds, two assists and one steal in 15 minutes off the bench.

TNT Katropa (2016) 
On August 12, 2016, Ammons signed with TNT Katropa of the PBA to replace Mario Little as their import for the 2016 PBA Governors' Cup. In his first career PBA game, Ammons recorded a double-double of 18 points and 18 rebounds as TNT won the game, 109–89, against the Blackwater Elite.

Personal life
The son of Tony and Katie Ammons, he is the youngest of three children. His sister, Taylor Ammons, is a former member of University of South Alabama women's basketball team. He majored in interdisciplinary studies.

References

External links
 South Alabama Jaguars bio
 RealGM profile
 ESPN profile 
 Feni Industries profile

1992 births
Living people
Al-Gharafa SC basketball players
American expatriate basketball people in Argentina
American expatriate basketball people in Mexico
American expatriate basketball people in North Macedonia
American expatriate basketball people in the Philippines
American expatriate basketball people in Qatar
American expatriate basketball people in Slovakia
American men's basketball players
Basketball players from Mississippi
Garra Cañera de Navolato players
Idaho Stampede players
Laguneros de La Comarca players
Philippine Basketball Association imports
Small forwards
South Alabama Jaguars men's basketball players
Sportspeople from Vicksburg, Mississippi
Tijuana Zonkeys players
TNT Tropang Giga players
NorthPort Batang Pier players